Vajdahunyad Castle (Hungarian: Vajdahunyad vára) is a castle in the City Park of Budapest, Hungary. It is a copy of Hunyad Castle, known as Corvin Castle (Romanian: Castelul Corvinilor), in Hunedoara, Romania. It was built in 1896 as part of the Millennial Exhibition which celebrated the 1,000 years of Hungary since the Hungarian Conquest of the Carpathian Basin in 895. The castle was designed by Ignác Alpár to feature copies of several landmark buildings from different parts of the Kingdom of Hungary, especially the Hunyad Castle in Transylvania (now in Romania). As the castle contains parts of buildings from various time periods, it displays different architectural styles: Romanesque, Gothic, Renaissance, and Baroque. Originally, it was made from cardboard and wood, but it became so popular that it was rebuilt from stone and brick between 1904 and 1908. Today, it houses the Museum of Hungarian Agriculture, the biggest agricultural museum in Europe.

The statue of the chronicler Anonymus (by Miklós Ligeti) is also displayed in the castle court.  lived in the 12th century (his true identity is unknown, but he was a notary of Béla III of Hungary), who wrote the chronicle Gesta Hungarorum (Deeds of the Hungarians).

The external wall of the castle contains a bust of Béla Lugosi, a Hungarian-American actor famous for portraying Count Dracula in the original 1931 film.

Gallery

References

Buildings and structures in Budapest
Castles in Hungary
Agriculture museums in Hungary
Museums in Budapest
Houses completed in 1908
1908 establishments in Austria-Hungary